Rudbar Yakhkesh (also Romanized as Rūdbār Yakhkesh; also known as Rūdbār) is a village in Panj Hezareh Rural District, in the Central District of Behshahr County, Mazandaran Province, Iran. At the 2006 census, its population was 158, in 32 families.

References 

Populated places in Behshahr County